The Seer  may refer to:

Film and television
 The Seer (film), a 2007 Italian thriller and horror film 
 "The Seer" (Sliders), an episode of the TV series 
 "The Seer" (Stargate Atlantis), an episode of the TV series 
 "The Seer", an episode of the cartoon Challenge of the GoBots

Literature
 The Seer (novel), by David Stahler Jr.
 The Seer (novel series), by Linda Joy Singleton
 The Seer (periodical), a Latter Day Saint periodical 1853–1854
 The Seer, a 2016 novel in The Seer Saga series by Sonia Orin Lyris

Music
 The Seer (Big Country album), 1986 
 The Seer (Swans album), 2012 
 The Seer (EP), by Tarja, 2008
 The Seers, a British rock group

See also 

 Seer (disambiguation)